The Kanva dynasty or Kanvayana that overthrew the Shunga dynasty in parts of eastern and central India, and ruled from 73 BCE to 28 BCE.

Although the Puranic literature indicates that the Kanva Dynasty ruled from the former capital of the Shunga Empire in Pataliputra, Magadha in Eastern India, their coins are primarily found in and around the region of Vidisha in Central India, which had also been the capital of later Shunga rulers.

The Kanva dynasty was established by Vasudeva Kanva in 73 BCE. Vasudeva was initially a minister of the Shunga Emperor Devabhuti, who then assassinated the former emperor and usurped the throne. The Kanva ruler allowed the kings of the Shunga dynasty to continue to rule in obscurity in a corner of their former dominions. There were four Kanva rulers. According to the Puranas, their dynasty was brought to an end by the Satavahanas in 28 BCE.

Origin
The Kanva kings were Brahmins. They were descendants of Sage Saubhari.  Vasudeva Kanva killed Devabhuti of the Shunga dynasty and established the rule of the Kanva dynasty.

Rulers
The first ruler of the Kanva dynasty was Vasudeva after whose Gotra the dynasty was named. He was succeeded by his son Bhumimitra. Coins bearing the legend Bhumimitra have been discovered from Panchala realm. Copper coins with the legend "Kanvasya" have also been found from Vidisha, as well as Kaushambi in the Vatsa realm. Bhumimitra ruled for fourteen years and was later succeeded by his son Narayana. Narayana ruled for twelve years. He was succeeded by his son Susharman who was the last king of the Kanva dynasty.

Succession
According to the Puranas, the last king of the Kanva dynasty was killed by Balipuccha, who founded the Andhra dynasty.

Aftermath
The defeat of the Kanva dynasty by the Satavahana dynasty was a localised event in Central India. However, numismatic and epigraphic evidence suggests that Magadha itself came under the hegemony of the Mitra dynasty of Kaushambi from the 1st century BCE until the 2nd century CE.

See also
 Magadha
 History of India
 Shunga dynasty
 Satavahana dynasty
 History of Hinduism

References

Citations

Sources
 
 

Brahmin communities
Magadha
Dynasties of Bengal
Kingdoms of Bihar
1st century BC in India